New Writtle Street Stadium was a football and short lived greyhound racing stadium located in Chelmsford, Essex, adjacent to the Essex County Cricket Club ground.

Origins
The stadium was constructed on spare land on the north side of New Writtle Street c.1922.

Football
Chelmsford moved into New Writtle Street in 1922.

The football club continued to play at the New Writtle Street ground following the formation of Chelmsford City as a professional entity, which the club purchased in 1939. During the early parts of World War II the ground was shared by Southend United, before it became a barrage balloon site in 1942.  The record attendance of 16,807 was set for a local derby with Colchester United on 10 September 1949. Floodlights were installed in 1960 and several plans were made to increase facilities at the ground, including installing a swimming pool and building office blocks or a hotel, but none came to fruition. The club's first floodlit game was against Wisbech Town on 21 September 1960, with the official opening coming in a friendly against Norwich City on 3 October 1960.

In 1997, the site was sold to developers and the club had to move out of Chelmsford. A housing estate now occupies the site.

Greyhound racing
On 23 September 1927, the London and Provincial Greyhound Racing Company bought land in Chelmsford to build a track, but stiff opposition resulted and the planned construction failed to materialise. However, on the 20 May 1932 the Mid-Essex Greyhound Racing Club raced for the first time at the stadium on New Writtle Street, home to Chelmsford Football Club and next door to the County Cricket Ground.

One year later, director AH Bradbury-Pratt began regular racing on Monday, Wednesday, Friday and Saturday evenings over 440 and 550 yards. The racing continued irregularly during the years 1935 to 1937 before finishing. A second spell of racing was submitted for planning by promoter Flight-Lieut CR Thomas in March 1946, finally starting in 1949 but once again the racing only lasted a few years. On both occasions the racing was independent (not affiliated to the sports governing body the National Greyhound Racing Club).

Between 1976 and 1978 prolonged plans to bring greyhound racing to the stadium failed.

References

Defunct football venues in England
Sport in Chelmsford
Defunct sports venues in Essex
Sports venues demolished in 1997
Demolished sports venues in the United Kingdom
Defunct greyhound racing venues in the United Kingdom
Buildings and structures in Chelmsford (city)
Chelmsford City F.C.
Football venues in Essex